The A135 is a road in England, running from Stockton-on-Tees through Eaglescliffe to Yarm on the A67, on the boundary with the River Tees.  It is also known as Yarm Road, and was the A19 before the dual carriageway was built.
In the 19th century, a stagecoach raced along Yarm Road against Locomotion Number One which ran alongside on the Stockton to Darlington railway line.  There is no record as to which won the race.

References 

Roads in England
Roads in Yorkshire
Transport in County Durham
Transport in North Yorkshire
Transport in the Borough of Stockton-on-Tees